James Cerretani and Philipp Oswald were the defending champions but chose not to defend their title.

Guido Andreozzi and Gerald Melzer won the title after defeating Steven de Waard and Ben McLachlan 6–2, 7–6(7–4) in the final.

Seeds

Draw

References
 Main Draw

International Tennis Tournament of Cortina - Doubles
2017 Doubles